William Robert Bastian (October 21, 1938  July 13, 2019) was a Republican member of the Pennsylvania House of Representatives, representing the 69th District.

Biography
Bastian and his wife lived in Friedens, Pennsylvania, and had five children. He retired prior to the 2008 election, having joined in 1999, and was succeeded by Republican Carl Walker Metzgar.

On July 11, 2019, Bastian was accidentally crushed by a rolling tractor's wheel on his farm. He died on July 13 at Conemaugh Memorial Medical Center in Johnstown, Pennsylvania.

References

External links
Pennsylvania House of Representatives - Bob Bastian
Pennsylvania House Republican Caucus - Representative Bob Bastian
Biography, voting record, and interest group ratings at Project Vote Smart

1938 births
2019 deaths
20th-century American politicians
21st-century American politicians
Accidental deaths in Pennsylvania
Cornell University alumni
Farming accident deaths
Republican Party members of the Pennsylvania House of Representatives
Military personnel from Pennsylvania
American veterinarians
Male veterinarians
People from Lycoming County, Pennsylvania
People from Somerset County, Pennsylvania
United States Air Force officers